Scat is a teenage novel by Carl Hiaasen, published in 2009. Scat, Hiaasen's third young adult novel, tells the mystery of a missing teacher named Mrs. Bunny Starch, and how two of her students, Nick Waters and Marta Gonzalez, will do everything they can to find her. They try their best in finding what had happened to their teacher while they were on their field trip. The book is available in over 1,000 libraries and was well-received when it came out, with a positive review in The New York Times.

The cover of Scat was created by Isabel Warren-Lynch The audiobook of Scat was narrated by Ed Asner, who was nominated for a Grammy Award for Best Spoken Word Album for Children for the work.

Carl Hiaasen is the author of other notable children's fiction novels, including Flush, in over 2,500 libraries. and Hoot, in over 3,200 libraries. He received the Newbery Honor for Hoot in 2003. Like Hoot and Flush, Scat takes place in Florida.

References

2009 American novels
American children's novels
Novels by Carl Hiaasen
Children's mystery novels
Novels set in schools
2009 children's books
Third-person narrative novels